Cyprus competed at the 2020 Winter Youth Olympics in Lausanne, Switzerland from 9 to 22 January 2020.

Alpine skiing

Girls

See also
Cyprus at the 2020 Summer Olympics

References

2020 in Cypriot sport
Nations at the 2020 Winter Youth Olympics
Cyprus at the Youth Olympics